Nicholas Davies may refer to:

 Nicholas Davies (journalist), journalist and author, formerly foreign editor at the Daily Mirror
 Nick Davies (born 1953), British investigative journalist for The Guardian and The Observer
 Nicholas Davies (cricketer) (born 1975), English cricketer
 Nicholas Barry Davies (born 1952), British zoologist
 Nicholas Llewelyn Davies (1903–1980), youngest of the Llewelyn Davies boys, inspiration for Peter Pan and the Lost Boys

See also 
 Nick Davis (disambiguation)